Dial Red O is a 1955 American film noir crime film directed by Daniel B. Ullman and starring Bill Elliott, Helene Stanley and Keith Larsen. It was the first in a series of five Los Angeles-set police thrillers that Elliott made for Allied Artists at the end of his career.

The letter "O" in the title actually represents a zero, since it is supposed to be the number on a phone dial.

Cast
 Bill Elliott as Detective Lt. Andy Flynn  
 Helene Stanley as Connie Wyatt  
 Keith Larsen as  Ralph Wyatt  
 Paul Picerni as Norman Roper  
 Jack Kruschen as  Lloyd Lavalle  
 Elaine Riley as  Policewoman Gloria  
 Robert Bice as Sgt. Tony Columbo  
 Rick Vallin as Deputy Clark  
 George Eldredge as Major Sutter  
 John Phillips as Deputy Morgan  
 Regina Gleason as Mrs. Roper  
 Rankin Mansfield as Coroner  
 Mort Mills as Newspaper Photographer  
 William Tannen as Devon—Newspaper Reporter 
 Shorty Rogers as Bandleader

See also
Sudden Danger (1955)
Calling Homicide (1956)
Chain of Evidence (1957)
Footsteps in the Night (1957)
List of American films of 1955

References

Bibliography
 Mayer, Geoff. Encyclopedia of American Film Serials. McFarland, 13 2017.

External links

1955 films
1955 crime films
American crime films
Films directed by Daniel B. Ullman
Allied Artists films
1950s English-language films
1950s American films
American black-and-white films